Veronika Cenková (born ) is a Czech female artistic gymnast, representing her nation at international competitions. 

She participated at the 2014 Summer Youth Olympics.
She competed at world championships, including the 2015 World Artistic Gymnastics Championships in Glasgow. She also participated at the 2015 European Games in Baku.

References

External links
database.fig-gymnastics.com
www.intylgymnast.com
thegymter.net

1999 births
Living people
Czech female artistic gymnasts
Place of birth missing (living people)
Gymnasts at the 2014 Summer Youth Olympics
Gymnasts at the 2015 European Games
European Games competitors for the Czech Republic